Cornwall Glacier is a glacier  long, flowing south from Crossover Pass in the Shackleton Range to join Recovery Glacier east of Ram Bow Bluff. It was first mapped in 1957 by the Commonwealth Trans-Antarctic Expedition, and named for General Sir James Handyside Marshall-Cornwall, a member of the Committee of Management of the Commonwealth Trans-Antarctic Expedition, 1955–58.

See also
 List of glaciers in the Antarctic
 Glaciology

References 

Glaciers of Coats Land